Carbon monofluoride (CF, CFx, or (CF)n), also called polycarbon monofluoride (PMF),  polycarbon fluoride, poly(carbon monofluoride), and graphite fluoride, is a material formed by high-temperature reaction of fluorine gas with graphite, charcoal, or pyrolytic carbon powder. It is a highly hydrophobic microcrystalline powder. In contrast to graphite intercalation compounds it is a covalent graphite compound.

Carbon is stable in a fluorine atmosphere up to about 400 °C, but between 420-600 °C a reaction takes place to give substoichiometric carbon monofluoride, CF0.68 appearing dark grey. With increasing temperature and fluorine pressure stoichiometries up to CF1.12 are formed. With increasing fluorine content the colour changes from dark grey to cream white indicating the loss of the aromatic character. The fluorine atoms are located in an alternating fashion above and under the former graphene plane, which is now buckled due to formation of covalent carbon-fluorine bonds. Reaction of carbon with fluorine at even higher temperature successively destroys the graphite compound to yield a mixture of gaseous fluorocarbons such as tetrafluorocarbon, CF4, and tetrafluoroethylene, C2F4.

In a similar fashion the recently found carbon allotrope fullerene, C60 reacts with fluorine gas to give fullerene fluorides with stoichiometries up to C60F48.

A precursor of carbon monofluoride is the fluorine-graphite intercalation compound, also called fluorine-GIC.

Other intercalation fluorides of carbon are:

 poly(dicarbon fluoride) ((C2F)n);
 tetracarbon monofluoride (TCMF, C4F).

Graphite fluoride is a precursor for preparation of graphene fluoride by a liquid phase exfoliation.

Application
Carbon monofluoride is used as a high-energy-density cathode material in lithium batteries of the "BR" type. Other uses are a wear reduction additive for lubricants, and weather-resistant additive for paints. Graphite fluoride is also used as both oxidizing agent and combustion modifier in rocket propellants and pyrolants.

Carbon monofluoride is commercially available as Carbofluor-brand materials.

References

 

Fluorides
Inorganic carbon compounds
Nonmetal halides